James Robert McLaughlin (January 3, 1902 – December 15, 1968) was a Major League Baseball third baseman. In his lone plate appearance, he drove in a run while making an out against Whit Wyatt.

Prior to his brief major league career, McLaughlin played eight seasons with the Sacramento Senators of the Pacific Coast League from  until . He batted .296 with 28 home runs during that time. He did not play professionally after 1932.

References

External links

1902 births
1968 deaths
Major League Baseball third basemen
St. Louis Browns players
Sacramento Senators players
Baseball players from Missouri